Peng Ming-min (15 August 19238 April 2022) was a noted democracy activist, advocate of Taiwan independence, and politician. Arrested for sedition in 1964 for printing a manifesto advocating democracy in his native Taiwan, he escaped to Sweden, before taking a post as a university teacher in the United States. After 22 years in exile he returned to become the Democratic Progressive Party's first presidential candidate in Taiwan's first direct presidential election in 1996.

Early life
Born during Japanese rule to a prominent doctor's family in rural Taiwan, Peng received his primary education in Taiwan before going to Tokyo for secondary education, graduating from Kwansei Gakuin Middle School in 1939 and the Third Higher School in 1942. During World War II, he studied law and political science at the Tokyo Imperial University (now the University of Tokyo). At the end of the war, in order to avoid the American bombing of Japan's capital, he decided to go to his brother near Nagasaki. En route to his brother, he lost his left arm in a bombing raid. While recuperating at his brother's house, he witnessed the second atomic blast that destroyed the city of Nagasaki.

After the Japanese surrender, Peng returned to Taiwan and enrolled in the National Taiwan University. He was studying for his bachelor's degree at the Law School when the February 28 Incident occurred.  During these terrifying weeks I remained quietly within my grandmother's house, frightened and worried. I had not been a member of any politically active group on the campus, and my name was on no petition or manifesto. No soldiers came to search our house, and I was not called out in the middle of the night as were some friends who disappeared. For all my hard work toward a degree in political science at the university, I was still far removed from practical politics and very naive. I had not yet fully realized how much more threatened our personal freedom was now than it had been under the Japanese. In several letters to my father at this time I expressed an angry reaction to the terrible things taking place at Taipei. I did not then know that my father's mail was being censored until one day the chief of police at Kaohsiung quietly warned my father to tell his son not to write such letters, and that my name too was now on a blacklist.

After receiving his bachelor's degree, Peng went on to pursue a master's degree (LL.M. 1953) at the Institute of Air and Space Law at the McGill University Faculty of Law, Montreal, Quebec, Canada, later a doctoral degree in law at the University of Paris in 1954. During his studies, Peng wrote some of the first essays on international air law published in France, Canada and Japan. His publications attracted considerable international attention and distinguished Peng as a pioneer in the new field of international air law.

Political life

Peng returned to Taiwan and in 1957, at age 34, he became the youngest full professor at the National Taiwan University.  While Peng was a professor and chairman of the Department of Political Science from 1961 to 1962, he attracted the attention of Chiang Kai-shek and other Kuomintang (KMT) leaders. Chiang appointed Peng as the advisor to the Republic of China's delegation to the United Nations, then the highest political position held by any Taiwanese, and hinted of future high-level governmental appointments. He quoted:My inner thoughts were in turmoil. The government and party bosses had made a great mistake in sending me to New York. This experience finally politicized me, and I was to lead a dual life thereafter, for many months, until I made a final commitment to challenge the dictatorship with a public demand for reform.

The three painstakingly printed 10,000 copies in secret, but before the manifesto could be distributed, Peng and his students were arrested on 20 September 1964. They languished in jail for several months before being tried for sedition by a military court. Peng was sentenced to eight years of imprisonment but his case attracted worldwide attention. Bowing to the increasing international pressure, Chiang Kai-shek released Peng from military prison 14 months later, but placed him under house arrest for life with strict surveillance.

By 1968, his house arrest had become so suffocating that friends and the Swedish chapter of Amnesty International helped plan for Peng's escape from Taiwan. In 1970, Peng managed to travel by plane to Hong Kong and from there to Sweden with a forged passport. He was granted political asylum in Sweden, but despite the freedom he enjoyed in Europe, he decided to pursue an appointment at the University of Michigan.  Both the KMT and the Communist Party of China strenuously objected, but the United States granted his request for a visa and Peng arrived in Michigan in August 1970. During his time at Michigan, he wrote his autobiography A Taste of Freedom.

While in exile, Peng continued to be a leading figure in Taiwan politics and American foreign policy issues. In 1981, he co-founded the Formosan Association for Public Affairs (FAPA), a Taiwanese lobbying organization based in Washington D.C., Peng served as FAPA's president from 1986 to 1988 and chaired the Asia-Pacific Democracy Association in 1989.  He also testified on Taiwan issues before the United States Congress on several occasions.

Return to Taiwan
With the death of Chiang Ching-kuo in 1988, Lee Teng-hui assumed the presidency and began to reform Taiwanese government. No longer threatened with arrest, Peng returned to Taiwan on 2 November 1992 to a crowd of 1,000 people at Taoyuan International Airport. He had been in exile for 22 years. Peng joined the Democratic Progressive Party in February 1995.

On 28 September 1995, after an arduous two-tiered nomination process involving 49 public debates around Taiwan, the Democratic Progressive Party nominated Peng as their candidate for Taiwan's first presidential elections. Outspokenly running on a platform of Taiwanese independence, he garnered 21% of the votes, a distant second to the incumbent Lee Teng-hui, who won the election.

In 2001, after  Chen Shui-bian was elected president, Peng was appointed one of Chen's senior advisors. In 2009, Peng's A Perfect Escape (逃亡), was published in Chinese, revealing the details of his dramatic escape in 1970. In July 2015, Peng and three others founded the Taiwan Independence Action Party. English translations of his articles were occasionally published in the Taipei Times.

Death
Peng died on 8 April 2022 at age 98. His remains was interred in a cemetery at the Presbyterian Church in Yancheng District, Kaohsiung.

References

External links
 A Taste of Freedom, full text
 
 Interview with Peng Ming-Min, 2006
 鯨魚網站
 Interview with Milo Thornberry, author of Fireproof Moth, 2011

1923 births
2022 deaths
Politicians of the Republic of China on Taiwan from Kaohsiung
Wright State University faculty
Politicians with disabilities
Senior Advisors to President Chen Shui-bian
National Taiwan University alumni
Democratic Progressive Party presidential nominees
Taiwan independence activists
Taiwanese revolutionaries
University of Michigan people
University of Paris alumni
McGill University alumni
University of Tokyo alumni
Aviation law
Taiwanese expatriates in Sweden
Taiwanese expatriates in Japan
Taiwanese expatriates in France
Taiwanese expatriates in the United States
Taiwanese politicians of Hakka descent
Taiwanese exiles